The Tithonus poem, also known as the old age poem or (with fragments of another poem by Sappho discovered at the same time) the New Sappho, is a poem by the archaic Greek poet Sappho.  It is part of fragment 58 in Eva-Maria Voigt's edition of Sappho.  The poem is from Book IV of the Alexandrian edition of Sappho's poetry.  It was first published in 1922, after a fragment of papyrus on which it was partially preserved was discovered at Oxyrhynchus in Egypt; further papyrus fragments published in 2004 almost completed the poem, drawing international media attention.  One of very few substantially complete works by Sappho, it deals with the effects of ageing.  There is scholarly debate about where the poem ends, as four lines previously thought to have been part of the poem are not found on the 2004 papyrus.

Preservation
Two lines of the poem are preserved in Athenaeus' Deipnosophistae.  In addition to this quotation, the poem is known from two papyri: one discovered at Oxyrhynchus in Egypt and first published in 1922; the other first published in 2004.  The lines quoted by Athenaeus are part of the poem as preserved on the Oxyrhynchus papyrus, but not the Cologne papyrus.

Oxyrhynchus papyrus
Part of the Tithonus poem was originally published in 1922 on a fragment of papyrus from Oxyrhynchus.  This fragment preserved part of 27 lines of Sappho's poetry, including the Tithonus poem.  The papyrus appears to be part of a copy of Book IV of the Alexandrian edition of Sappho's poetry, as all of the poems appear to be in the same metre.  From the handwriting, the papyrus can be dated to the second century AD.  Today the papyrus is part of the collection of the Sackler Library in Oxford University.

Cologne papyrus
In 2004, Martin Gronewald and Robert Daniel published three fragments of papyrus from the Cologne Papyrus Collection, which taken with the existing fragment from Oxyrhynchus provided the almost complete text to five stanzas of the poem.  The Cologne papyrus, preserved on cartonnage, is from the early third century BC, making it the oldest known papyrus containing a poem by Sappho.

The papyrus is part of an anthology of poetry, with poems on similar themes grouped together. Along with the Tithonus poem, two others are preserved on the papyrus published by Gronewald and Daniel: one in the same metre, one written in a different hand and in a different metre.  The metre of this last poem has characteristics which do not appear in any known metre used by the Lesbian poets.   It also contains word forms which appear not to be in the Aeolic dialect used by Sappho, and refers to the myth of Orpheus in a form not known to have existed in Sappho's time.  For these reasons, the poem cannot be by Sappho.

Poem

The Tithonus poem is twelve lines long, and is in a metre called "acephalous Hipponacteans with internal double-choriambic expansion".  It is the fourth poem by Sappho to be sufficiently complete to treat as an entire work, along with the Ode to Aphrodite, fragment 16, and fragment 31; a fifth, the Brothers Poem, was discovered in 2014.

The poem is written as an exhortation to a group of young women, putting forward the singer as an example to emulate. It discusses the singer's old age, and tells the audience that while they too will grow old and lose their beauty, their musical abilities will be retained.  Anton Bierl suggests that it was originally composed as a didactic work, intended to teach young women about beauty and mortality.  It is one of a number of Sappho's poems which discuss old age.

The poem's common name comes from the Greek myth of Tithonus, which is mentioned in lines 9 to 12.  According to legend Tithonus was a Trojan prince, loved by Eos, the goddess Dawn.  She asked that Zeus make her lover immortal; he granted the request, but as she did not ask for eternal youth for Tithonus, he continued to age for eternity.  The story of Tithonus was popular in archaic Greek poetry, though the reference to him in this poem seems out of place, according to Rawles.  However, Page duBois notes that the use of a mythical exemplum to illustrate the point of a poem, such as the story of Tithonus in this poem, is a characteristic feature of Sappho's poetry – duBois compares it to Sappho's use of the story of Helen in fragment 16.
Martin Litchfield West considers that these lines seem like a weak ending to the poem, though Tithonus functions as a parallel to Sappho in her old age.

Text 
 × ‒ υ υ ‒ ‒ υ υ ‒ ‒ υ υ ‒ υ ‒ ᴖ 

     —via R. Janko, see also W. Annis

Metre
The metre of the Tithonus poem was already known, before the discovery of the Cologne papyrus, from four quotations of Sappho.  Two of these are preserved in the Enchiridion of Hephaestion; he describes the metre as aiolikon and says that Sappho used it frequently. The metre is of the form "× ¯ ˘ ˘ ¯ ¯ ˘ ˘ ¯ ¯ ˘ ˘ ¯ ˘ ¯ ¯", which is part of the larger class of aeolic metres.  The poems in this metre by Sappho are conventionally thought to have been from the fourth book of the Alexandrian edition, though no direct evidence either confirms or denies this.

Continuation after line 12
Before the Cologne papyri were published in 2004, lines 11 to 26 of Papyrus Oxyrhynchus 1787 were considered to be a single poem, fragment 58 in the Lobel-Page (and subsequently Voigt) numbering systems.  The poem on the Cologne papyrus, however, only contains 12 lines.  These begin with line 11 of P. Oxy. 1787, confirming the long-standing suggestion that the poem began there.  The Cologne version of the poem is thus missing what were long believed to be the final four lines of the poem.

Much of the scholarly discussion of the poem has concerned the difference between the endings of the Tithonus poem preserved in the two papyri. Scholars disagree about how this should be interpreted.  André Lardinois lists possible explanations which have been put forward: firstly that the Cologne papyrus did not contain the full poem, but only the first twelve lines; secondly that the poem does end after line twelve and the final lines on the Oxyrhynchus papyrus were part of another poem; and thirdly that there were two different endings for the poem, one at line twelve and one continuing on to line sixteen.

West argues that the four lines missing from the Cologne papyrus were part of a separate poem, though Lardinois comments that there is no evidence in the Oxyrhynchus papyrus to confirm or deny this.  However, other scholars, including Gronewald and Daniel, who originally published the Cologne fragments, believe that the poem did continue for these four lines.  Lardinois suggests that there may have been two versions of the poem current in antiquity, one ending after the twelfth line, the other continuing to line 16.  Gregory Nagy agrees, arguing that the two versions were appropriate for different performance contexts.

If the four contested lines were part of the Tithonus poem, its tone would have changed significantly. The sixteen-line version of the poem has a much more optimistic ending than the twelve-line version, expressing hope for an afterlife.

Reception
The publication of the Cologne papyri in 2004, making the Tithonus poem almost complete, drew international attention from both scholars and the popular press.  The discovery was covered in newspapers in the US and the UK, as well as online. The Daily Telegraph described the discovery as "the rarest of gifts", while Marylin Skinner said that the discovery was the find of a lifetime for classicists.

Since the discovery, there has been a significant amount of scholarship on the poem.  At the 138th annual meeting of the American Philological Association, two separate panels discussed the poems, and papers based on these panels were later published as The New Sappho on Old Age, edited by Marylin Skinner and Ellen Greene.  At least two other collections of essays on the Cologne papyri have been published.  The discovery has been seen as particularly significant for understanding the transmission and reception of Sappho's poetry in the ancient world.

Notes

References

Works cited

External links 
 Tithonus poem, text, translation by M. L. West, and notes by William Harris.
 José-Antonio Fernández-Delgado, "On the Cologne Sappho Papyrus" ZPE (2014)

Ancient Greek poems
Greek-language papyri
Works about old age
Works by Sappho
Eos